The 57th British Academy Film Awards, given by the British Academy of Film and Television Arts, took place on 15 February 2004 and honoured the best films of 2003.

The Lord of the Rings: The Return of the King won Best Film, Best Adapted Screenplay, Best Cinematography, Best Visual Effects, and the Audience Award. Lost in Translation won both lead acting awards for Bill Murray and Scarlett Johansson. Bill Nighy won Best Supporting Actor for Love Actually and Renée Zellweger won Best Supporting Actress for Cold Mountain. Touching the Void, directed by Andrew Eaton, was voted Outstanding British Film of 2003.

Winners and nominees

Statistics

See also
 76th Academy Awards
 29th César Awards
 9th Critics' Choice Awards
 56th Directors Guild of America Awards
 17th European Film Awards
 61st Golden Globe Awards
 24th Golden Raspberry Awards
 8th Golden Satellite Awards
 18th Goya Awards
 19th Independent Spirit Awards
 9th Lumières Awards
 15th Producers Guild of America Awards
 30th Saturn Awards
 10th Screen Actors Guild Awards
 56th Writers Guild of America Awards

References
 http://news.bbc.co.uk/1/hi/entertainment/3490323.stm
 https://www.cbsnews.com/news/king-reigns-at-uk-film-awards/
 https://ew.com/article/2004/01/16/cold-mountain-rings-lead-bafta-nominees/

Film057
2003 film awards
2004 in British cinema
February 2004 events in the United Kingdom
2004 in London
2003 awards in the United Kingdom